My Hang V. Huynh (born 1962) is a Vietnamese-American chemist in the High Explosives Science and Technology Group at Los Alamos National Laboratory. Huynh's research has led to the creation of "Green Primary Explosives" which are "designed to replace traditional mercury and lead-based explosives and reduce damaging side-effects to the environment and human health."

Life
Huynh received degrees from SUNY Geneseo (B.A. and B.S.) and SUNY Buffalo (Ph.D.) in 1991 and 1998 respectively. In 2007 Huynh received two major awards in recognition of her work: the E.O. Lawrence Award for exceptional contributions to the national, economic and energy security of the United States, and she was named to the MacArthur Fellows Program; an award known as the "genius grant."

Outlining her work, the MacArthur Foundation explained the significance of her findings:

References

21st-century American chemists
MacArthur Fellows
1962 births
Living people
American people of Vietnamese descent